The Sanders portrait is reputed to be one of the few images of William Shakespeare done in his lifetime. It features a middle-aged man wearing a black doublet with silver ornamentation. It also has a label affixed to the back which reads:
Shakspere
Born April 23=1564
Died April 23-1616
Aged 52
This Likeness taken 1603
Age at that time 39 ys
This label was transcribed in 1909 by Marion Henry Spielmann; today, the original text is not legible.

The Sanders portrait is one of the most researched portraits claimed to depict William Shakespeare (1564–1616). It is named for the man that owned (and perhaps painted) the portrait, John Sanders, whose family has owned the portrait for over 400 years – including a transatlantic voyage that resulted in its presence in Canada.

The portrait’s authenticity as a true likeness of Shakespeare continues to be questioned by critics though supporters point to scientific tests, genealogical research, and historical contexts which date this portrait not only to Shakespeare’s lifetime, but place it as originally painted and owned by a family who lived in the same neighbourhood as William Shakespeare and would have had connections through guild membership with the playwright. The portrait’s presence in Canada, its currently being in the private sphere, and its limited budget for more research and publicity are all factors in the lack of attention shown to the portrait.

Partnering with current owner, Lloyd Sullivan, recent research from the Canadian Adaptations of Shakespeare Project (CASP) at the University of Guelph, has sought to return the portrait to the public eye and establish it as the only true likeness of Shakespeare painted in his lifetime.

Genealogy and the Sanders family
Extensive genealogical research has been undertaken by CASP researchers and Warwickshire and Worcestershire family historian Pamela Hinks to confirm the oral history of the Sanders family provided by Lloyd Sullivan, owner of the portrait from 1972 until his death in 2019. This research suggests that the Sanders Portrait is the only likeness of Shakespeare which traces back directly to Shakespeare's lifetime.

The family of Lloyd Sullivan was traced back directly to one John Sanders, Sullivan’s ten times removed great-grandfather (thirteen generations before Sullivan). Proponents of the painting suggest that either John Sanders or his brother William painted the portrait of Shakespeare in 1603, when the family was living close to Shakespeare’s home in London, a house owned by Christopher and Mary Mountjoy on the corner of Silver Street and Monkwell Street (a. k. a. Muggle Street), in Cripplegate.

The Sanders family and Shakespeare moved in circles that would have encouraged contact between the two: both families were intermarried with the Thockmorton, Catesby, and Arden families. For instance, in 1592, Phillipi Sanders (a brother of John Sanders) married Anna Heminges, a cousin of John Heminges – one of Shakespeare's closest associates. Likewise, in 1613, a Joccossa Sanders married John Heminges's cousin Thomas Heminges.

An oral tradition, documented in Stephanie Nolen's Shakespeare's Face (2002), holds that for 400 years the portrait was passed down in the family while knowledge of its existence remained private. Its ownership can be verified back as far as 1909 when M. H. Spielmann studied the painting – at which time it was in the possession of T. Hale Sanders, who had taken ownership of it from his uncle through his father. Thomas (T.) Hale Sanders is the great grandfather of Lloyd Sullivan. In early 1919 Agnes Hales Sanders, grandmother of Lloyd Sullivan, travelled from Montreal to London to reclaim the Sanders Portrait. Since then it has been held in Montreal and Ottawa.

The portrait's existence was made public in May 2001 by Lloyd Sullivan. Since then has undergone multiple tests and been shown in art galleries, including the National Portrait Gallery in London.

Sanders, Shakespeare, and Canada

Battle of Wills
A 2008 documentary by Anne Henderson sought to tell the story of the Canadian-owned portrait of Shakespeare. The film both highlighted some of the technical and financial difficulties of caring for the painting, and showcased the controversy that surrounds the Sanders Portrait and other portraits claiming to be life likenesses of William Shakespeare. Interviews with descendants of the Sanders family; researchers Marie-Claude Corbeil, Daniel Fischlin and Pamela Hinks; actors Joseph Fiennes and Michael Pennington; as well as art experts Lily Koltun,  David Loch, and Philip Mould offer an interdisciplinary inside look at the Shakespeare Portrait debates.

As of November 2013 a second part of the documentary is in the works.

"Look here upon this picture:" A Symposium on the Sanders Portrait of Shakespeare
On 28 November 2013 all of the current information on the Sanders Portrait was made public by researchers from the University of Guelph and supplemented by discussions of the scientific studies done, the internal evidence (that is, a reading of the clothing of the sitter, the status of the sitter, the date on the portrait, and the artistic style), and a discussion of the media and cultural importance of the portrait. The day sought to renew interest in the portrait, establish it as the only portrait thought to be done in Shakespeare’s own lifetime, and to act as catalyst in a sale that would move the portrait from private to public domain.

The Oxford University Press – Shakespeare Made in Canada Series
The Sanders Portrait has become the face of new editions of Shakespeare’s plays targeted as teaching tools for Canadian high school and undergraduate students. Oxford University Press commissioned the texts, which have been curated by General Editor Daniel Fischlin to provide a uniquely Canadian perspective on the works.

Editions of The Tempest and Romeo and Juliet were released in November 2013, while new editions of Hamlet and A Midsummer Night’s Dream are in progress. All the plays feature the Sanders Portrait on the front cover and a brief summary of the portrait's provenance and research inside.

Scientific testing
In all, thirteen tests have been done over a fifteen-year period on the Sanders Portrait, more than any other reputed portrait of Shakespeare, performed by researchers across Canada and the world. These tests include:

Dendrochronology

Conducted by Dr. Peter Klein of the University of Hamburg, Germany in 1994. Using tree-ring dating, Dr. Klein determined that the oak panel was from the Baltic Region and that the earliest possible date of the painting was 1597.

Radiography

Conducted by Dr. Marie-Claude Corbeil, Senior Scientist at the Analytical Research Lab of the Canadian Conservation Institute (CCI), in order to determine that the likeness of Shakespeare was the first and only painting on the oak panel. The radiograph concluded there was not any other painting beneath the Sanders Portrait.

Infrared and ultraviolet radiation

Conducted by Dr. Corbeil of CCI to determine if there had been any retouching of the paint after it was finished. The result was that no retouching had occurred.

Paint samples

Conducted by Dr. Corbeil of CCI to determine that the paint and materials used were appropriate to the date of 1603. While this cannot definitively date the paint used, it can determine if the materials are too new. The results found that all of the paint materials and colours were consistent with those used in England in the early 17th century.
The red paint of the date in the top corner was tested in the paint sample analysis and does not appear to be added after the portrait was finished.

The label
The label has been the source of much controversy. Many claim that the wording on the label "This Likeness taken" is not consistent with 17th century practices. Others argue that the birthdate of Shakespeare (23 April) was an 18th century mistake and not to be trusted. However, scientific tests have proven that this date was, most probably, written in the 17th century and could definitively prove 23 April as Shakespeare’s date of birth.

Label analysis
Conducted by Dr. Corbeil of CCI which determined the label was made of rag paper from linen fibers, a product often used in the 17th century and predates pulp paper.

Glue
The glue used to affix the label was tested by Dr. Corbeil of CCI and determined to be a starch paste.

Radiocarbon dating of the paper
A sample of the rag paper label was sent to Roelf Beukens at the IsoTrace Laboratory associated with the University of Toronto. The radiocarbon dating concluded that the rag paper could date between 1475 and 1640. Dr. Marie Claude Corbeil suggests that the label was probably affixed within a few decades of Shakespeare’s death in 1616.

Ink
The analytical laboratory McCrone Associates Inc. in Chicago, Illinois conducted forensic ink tests on the label and concluded the following.:
 The materials used in the ink are consistent with the 17th century ink manufacturing practices
 A quill pen was used
 The ink is well-integrated into the paper fibres of the label, in the same manner as iron gall ink, which was used in the 17th century
 No dyes, binding mediums, or other alterations suggest any recent additions or changes to the ink on the label

Internal evidence

Lloyd DeWitt

Curator of European Art at the Art Gallery of Ontario, DeWitt examined the portrait’s style and oak panels, and determined them consistent with Elizabethan English Portraits. DeWitt also believes the Sanders to be a "friendship portrait," painted by someone who knew the sitter. DeWitt also concluded that the construction of the oak panel is, in all likelihood, English.

Jenny Tiramani

The former director of theatre design at the Globe Theatre and foremost living expert on Elizabethan and Jacobean dress (among other accolades) inspected the clothing and hairstyles of the sitter in the Sanders Portrait and compared it with the biographical knowledge we have of William Shakespeare and his life in 1603 (when the picture was painted). Tiramani concluded:
 Shakespeare’s elevation to a member of the King’s Men in 1603 was likely the reason for having the portraiture painted.
 This elevation in status also allowed Shakespeare access to the silver thread and other elements of his dress that would have, the year earlier, been restricted from him by sumptuary laws.
 The undercoat is similar to those worn in other early 17th century theatre portraits.
 The hairstyle is consistent with those styles worn by young courtiers in the 17th century.

Controversy

The authenticity of the Sanders Portrait has not been widely accepted by scholars. As Adam Gopnik has written in The New Yorker, "...the portrait has, to its doubters, one overwhelming problem: it does not look much like Shakespeare." Gopnik goes on to describe how the Sanders Portrait does not seem to resemble the Droeshout portrait or the Shakespeare funerary bust at Stratford-upon-Avon, both of which resemble each other, and are accepted by scholars as having been contemporary likenesses of Shakespeare. Gopnik does, however, refer to a comparison of the Sanders and Droeshout portraits that found 16 facial points in common, including the attached earlobe.

The image has often been overlooked by scholars, with a host of subjective excuses, including that the man depicted seems too young; or that the birth date given is, or has been, used speculatively, and only after the 18th century. The label and its ink, however, has been tested and dated to within Shakespeare's life or shortly thereafter and could prove to be a final piece  of evidence necessary to commit to 23 April as Shakespeare's date of birth and death.

Ownership

In December 2013 it was announced that a tentative deal was in the works for an unnamed Canadian family to purchase the portrait. The family is reported to be excited to keep the portrait in the Canadian public domain and is expected to donate the portrait to a public arts institution.

After Lloyd Sullivan's death in 2019, guardianship of the portrait passed to his nephew James Hale-Sanders.

References

External links
"Canadian Adaptations of Shakespeare Project"
"The Poet's Hand: Why do we still search for relics of the Bard" from The New Yorker

Portraits of William Shakespeare
English paintings
Portraits by British artists
16th-century portraits
17th-century portraits